Ashley Kratzer (born February 8, 1999) is an American female tennis player.

Kratzer has a career high WTA singles ranking of 333 and a career high doubles ranking of 447.

In 2017, Kratzer won the USTA National Girls' Championships, securing a wildcard in the main draw of the 2017 US Open.

In 2020, Kratzer tested positive for GHRP-6 and was suspended from competition for four years on March 28 of that year. The ITF's decision dated the end of her suspension as March 27, 2024. Kratzer's subsequent appeal to the Court of Arbitration for Sport (CAS) was rejected in June 2021.

ITF finals

Singles: 3 (3 runner–ups)

Doubles: 1 (1 runner–up)

References

External links 
 
 
 
 

1999 births
Living people
American female tennis players
Sportspeople from Newport Beach, California
Doping cases in tennis
Tennis people from California
21st-century American women